Yassine is a unisex given name, an alternative of Yasin, Yassin, Yaseen and Yacine. The name is most common in North Africa, particularly Morocco. ) The name is derived from a chapter (surah) of the Quran called Ya-Sin. It is an epithet of the prophet Muhammad.

Notable persons

Given name
Yassine Abdellaoui (born 1975), Dutch–Moroccan footballer
Yassine Bensghir (born 1983), Moroccan middle-distance runner
Yassine Boukhari (born 1986), Algerian footballer
Yassine Chikhaoui (born 1986), Tunisian footballer
Yassine Diboun (born 1978), American ultra-runner
Yassine El Ghanassy (born 1990), Moroccan footballer
Jasin Rammal-Rykała (born 1994), Polish opera singer

Surname
Abdesslam Yassine (born 1928), leader of a Moroccan Islamist organisation
Ismail Yassine (1912−1972), Egyptian actor and comedian
Nadia Yassine (born 1958), daughter of Abdesslam, head of the feminine branch of the same organisation

See also
Ahmed Yassin (born 1937), Palestinian imam and politician, founder of Hamas
Salle Ibn Yassine, indoor sporting arena in Rabat, Morocco
Yasin (name), disambiguation
Yassin (name), disambiguation
Yacine (name), disambiguation

References

Arabic-language surnames
Arabic masculine given names